The 22nd Polish Film Awards took place on 2 March 2020 at the Polish Theatre in Warsaw, Poland. The ceremony honored the best in Polish cinema of 2019, presented by the Polish Film Academy. The ceremony was hosted by comedian Maciej Stuhr.

Corpus Christi won eleven awards at the ceremony, including Best Film. Other winners included Icarus: The Legend of Mietek Kosz and Mister T. with two awards each, and The Coldest Game, The Favourite, Sword of God, Tell No One, and Wataha with one.

Winners and nominees
The nominations were announced on 5 February 2020. Winners are listed first, highlighted in boldface, and indicated with a double dagger.

Films with multiple awards and nominations

References

External links
 

Polish Film Awards ceremonies
Polish Film Awards
Polish Film Awards